Abraham Bass may refer to:
 Abraham Bass (cricketer)
 Abraham Bass (footballer)